Nathan Daniel Robertson, (born September 3, 1977) is a former professional baseball pitcher. He played in Major League Baseball for the Florida Marlins, Detroit Tigers and Philadelphia Phillies.

Career

Florida Marlins
Robertson attended Wichita State University and was drafted by the Florida Marlins in the fifth round of the 1999 Major League Baseball draft. Robertson underwent Tommy John surgery in 1998 while a sophomore at Wichita State. Robertson pitched for the Low-A Utica Blue Sox and Single-A Kane County Cougars; with the latter he was 6–1 with a 2.29 ERA in eight starts. Robertson returned to Kane County for the  season but spent most of the year on the disabled list battling tendinitis in his left elbow. Florida moved him up to the High-A Brevard County Manatees, where he went 11–4 as a starter. At Portland Robertson amassed a 10–9 record with a 3.42 ERA, sufficient that Florida summoned him to the major league club in early September.

Robertson made his Major League debut on September 7, 2002, for the Marlins, pitching  innings and allowing four earned runs in a 4–1 loss to the Pittsburgh Pirates at PNC Park. Robertson moved to the bullpen for the remainder of the season, making five relief appearances. The following January Florida traded Robertson along with Gary Knotts and Rob Henkel to the Detroit Tigers for Mark Redman and Jerrod Fuell.

Detroit Tigers
Robertson began the  season with the Toledo Mud Hens, Detroit's Triple-A affiliate. Robertson remained there until late August, when Detroit, recalled him. In his first start with Detroit and second major league start overall, Robertson threw 8 innings against the Texas Rangers, giving up two earned runs and striking out eight. Robertson did not figure in the decision, as Detroit lost the game 4–2 in sixteen innings. Robertson won his first major league game eleven days later, pitching five innings in an 8–4 victory over the Chicago White Sox.

Robertson's best pitch is his four-seam fastball, followed by a "plus" slider and major-league quality change-up.

In 2005, he began wearing clear corrective lenses to correct his lazy eye.

Robertson invented a new means of rallying the Tigers during a June 2006 game with the New York Yankees. While wearing a microphone for television, Robertson began stuffing his mouth with Big League Chew to encourage the Tigers to score, down 5–0. Iván Rodríguez hit a home run on the subsequent at-bat. Though the Tigers lost the game, the "Gum Time!" tradition has caught on among Detroit players and fans.

Robertson earned his first career postseason victory on October 10, 2006, by pitching five shutout innings against the Oakland Athletics in game 1 which helped launch the Detroit Tigers into their ALCS sweep of the A's and their first pennant since 1984.

In 2008, he tied for the major league lead in bunt hits allowed, with nine.

Robertson is also a part owner of the Wichita Wingnuts independent baseball organization.

On August 22, 2008, Tigers manager Jim Leyland announced that Nate was being demoted to the bullpen due to ongoing trouble with his slider.  Nate was quoted by the Detroit Free Press as saying that it was the "lowest point" of his career.

Second stint with Florida Marlins
On March 30, 2010, Robertson was traded to the Florida Marlins for minor league pitcher Jay Voss and cash considerations.  He was designated for assignment on July 21. One week later he was released.

St. Louis Cardinals & Philadelphia Phillies
Robertson signed a minor league contract with the St. Louis Cardinals on August 2, 2010, and was assigned to the Triple-A Memphis Redbirds.  Robertson exercised an opt-out clause on August 23, and signed a minor league contract with the Philadelphia Phillies on August 24, 2010, reporting to Triple-A Lehigh Valley. On September 9, 2010, Robertson was designated for assignment by the Phillies, a day after giving up 5 runs in  innings against the Marlins and nearly blowing a 10-run lead.

Seattle Mariners
On January 20, 2011, Robertson signed a minor league contract with the Seattle Mariners with an invitation to Spring training.

Chicago Cubs
On February 19, 2012, the Chicago Cubs and Robertson agreed to terms to a minor league contract.

Toronto Blue Jays
On July 14, 2012, the Toronto Blue Jays signed him to a contract. The Blue Jays assigned Robertson to their AAA affiliate Las Vegas 51s.

Texas Rangers
On January 21, 2013, the Texas Rangers signed Robertson to a minor league contract.

Second stint with Tigers
On March 13, 2013, Robertson signed a minor league deal with the Detroit Tigers. On May 17, 2013, Robertson was granted his release from the Tigers, as he was struggling with his command in Triple-A.

Coaching career

Robertson is now a pitching coach for Maize High School. In 2017, he won a state championship.

References

External links

Nate Robertson official blog

1977 births
Living people
Florida Marlins players
Detroit Tigers players
Philadelphia Phillies players
Wichita State Shockers baseball players
Utica Blue Sox players
Kane County Cougars players
Portland Sea Dogs players
Brevard County Manatees players
Toledo Mud Hens players
Erie SeaWolves players
Memphis Redbirds players
Lehigh Valley IronPigs players
Tacoma Rainiers players
Iowa Cubs players
Wichita Wingnuts players
Las Vegas 51s players
Round Rock Express players
Baseball players from Wichita, Kansas
Major League Baseball pitchers